David Levine is an entertainment executive.

Background 
Levine was born in Montreal. At the start of his career, he was a news broadcaster in Toronto. In the 1970s, he worked at CKGM and CKEY. After several years in this field, he joined Vickers and Benson Advertising in Canada as the director of promotion. A&W Root Beer and McDonald's. Soon thereafter, he became the General Manager of Vickers and Benson’s Analytical Communications, Inc.

In the 1970s, Levine established promark in Canada as a promotions agency. Some of the company's early clients included Planters Peanuts, Fleishmann's Margarine, Oh Henry Chocolate Bars, Baby Ruth, A&W Root Beer and McDonald's.

In 1977, Promark landed the contract to promote a daredevil called "The Human Fly". This project allowed the company to enter into the entertainment industry and the U.S. market. Levine sold the property to Marvel Comics, who turned it into a comic book superhero. Toy rights were sold to Mattel Toys.

In 1978, the Toronto Star described Levine as "a hype artist, a media manipulator, an advertising wizard,  a hustler, an exaggerator" working in the "underbelly of the entertainment business". He was working with acts including Donna Summer, Dionne Warwicke, and Lou Rawls

In the same year, 1978, Levine established Talisman Records. After the release of one single, "Pretty Girls" by Lisa Dal Bello, and one album, he sold Talisman Records to Capitol Records. While promoting Dal Bello, he secured a promotional tie-in with Revlon.

A short time later, he formed Hot Vinyl Records and signed Patsy Gallant and Dwayne Ford to the label.

In 1983, thru his company, Promark Television Broadcast, Levine began selling full-length motion pictures and music specials to cable and home video, including Mrs. World, Miss Fitness, From Hawaii with Love and musical specials featuring Dianne Warwick, Fats Domino, Ricky Nelson, Liberace, Johnny Cash.

Since at least 2001, Levine was involved in TV syndication.

References 

Year of birth missing (living people)
Living people
Place of birth missing (living people)
Canadian entertainment industry businesspeople